Caruthers is a census-designated place (CDP) in Fresno County, California, United States. The population was 2,497 at the 2010 census, up from 2,103 at the 2000 census.

Geography

History
The first post office in Caruthers opened in 1891. The name of the town honors W.A. Caruthers, a local farmer.  Fresno County Public Library opened a branch in Caruthers in 1911, in the town's hotel. After moving to multiple locations, it occupied its current home in 2003, which is designed to emulate the look of a tank house and barn.

Demographics

2010
At the 2010 census Caruthers had a population of 2,497. The racial makeup of Caruthers was 1,224 (49.0%) White, 14 (0.6%) African American, 38 (1.5%) Native American, 221 (8.9%) Asian, 0 (0.0%) Pacific Islander, 904 (36.2%) from other races, and 96 (3.8%) from two or more races. Hispanic or Latino of any race were 1,591 persons (63.7%).

The census reported that 2,486 people (99.6% of the population) lived in households, 11 (0.4%) lived in non-institutionalized group quarters, and no one was institutionalized.

There were 639 households, 345 (54.0%) had children under the age of 18 living in them, 409 (64.0%) were opposite-sex married couples living together, 106 (16.6%) had a female householder with no husband present, 39 (6.1%) had a male householder with no wife present.  There were 35 (5.5%) unmarried opposite-sex partnerships, and 3 (0.5%) same-sex married couples or partnerships. 72 households (11.3%) were one person and 36 (5.6%) had someone living alone who was 65 or older. The average household size was 3.89.  There were 554 families (86.7% of households); the average family size was 4.16.

The age distribution was 793 people (31.8%) under the age of 18, 302 people (12.1%) aged 18 to 24, 631 people (25.3%) aged 25 to 44, 528 people (21.1%) aged 45 to 64, and 243 people (9.7%) who were 65 or older.  The median age was 29.7 years. For every 100 females, there were 101.0 males.  For every 100 females age 18 and over, there were 96.5 males.

There were 680 housing units at an average density of ,of which 639 were occupied, 426 (66.7%) by the owners and 213 (33.3%) by renters.  The homeowner vacancy rate was 1.6%; the rental vacancy rate was 3.2%.  1,617 people (64.8% of the population) lived in owner-occupied housing units and 869 people (34.8%) lived in rental housing units.

2000
At the 2000 census there were 2,103 people, 572 households, and 481 families in the CDP. The racial makeup of the CDP was 52.40% White, 0.57% Black or African American, 0.29% Native American, 6.18% Asian, 30.91% from other races, and 9.65% from two or more races.  53.26% of the population were Hispanic or Latino of any race.
Of the 572 households 50.0% had children under the age of 18 living with them, 66.4% were married couples living together, 11.4% had a female householder with no husband present, and 15.9% were non-families. 14.7% of households were one person and 9.6% were one person aged 65 or older.  The average household size was 3.66 and the average family size was 4.01.

The age distribution was 36.0% under the age of 18, 8.7% from 18 to 24, 28.7% from 25 to 44, 16.6% from 45 to 64, and 9.9% 65 or older.  The median age was 29 years. For every 100 females, there were 94.9 males.  For every 100 females age 18 and over, there were 93.7 males.

The median household income was $40,109 and the median family income  was $45,221. Males had a median income of $32,535 versus $25,114 for females. The per capita income for the CDP was $12,642.  About 11.6% of families and 17.6% of the population were below the poverty line, including 23.6% of those under age 18 and 15.7% of those age 65 or over.

Caruthers fair
Well-known events in the area include the Caruthers District Fair. It was started in 1923, after some hesitation by community members as work and expenses increased. One of the first programs at the fair involved a football game between Caruthers and Fresno State. Caruthers lost 41–0. In early years, the fair hosted races on sheep. Every year a fair queen is chosen, who is selected based on ticket sales. A group of girls sell them during the summer to support the fair.

External links
 Caruthers Unified School District

References

Census-designated places in Fresno County, California
Populated places established in 1891
1891 establishments in California
Census-designated places in California